Samya Hassani (born 3 January 2000) is a Dutch-born Moroccan footballer who plays as a forward for SC Telstar and the Morocco women's national team.

Club career 
Hassani has played for Alkmaar in the Netherlands.

After a year playing for Belgian Women's Super League club Gent, it was announced that Hassani will be playing for the revived Telstar team in the Dutch Eredivisie for the 2022/23 season.

International career
Hassani made her senior debut for Morocco on 14 June 2021 in a 3–2 friendly home win over Mali.

See also
List of Morocco women's international footballers

References

External links 

2000 births
Living people
Citizens of Morocco through descent
Moroccan women's footballers
Women's association football forwards
Morocco women's international footballers
Footballers from Amsterdam
Dutch women's footballers
Eredivisie (women) players
Dutch sportspeople of Moroccan descent
K.A.A. Gent (women) players
Telstar (women's football club) players